This list of newspapers in Minnesota shows newspapers that are published currently in the state of Minnesota in the United States of America.  According to records of the Library of Congress, there have been throughout its history almost 4,000 newspaper titles in the current area of the state of Minnesota.  At the beginning of 2020, there were over 500 newspapers in publication in Minnesota.  The earliest paper was the Minnesota Weekly Democrat in St. Paul in 1803 well before statehood in 1858.  There are three newspapers that trace their roots back to before Minnesota statehood in 1858.  The oldest, continually published newspaper is the St. Paul Pioneer Press.

Daily newspapers
According to the Minnesota Newspaper Association in 2020, there were 24 daily newspapers in print in Minnesota. As of 2019, The Star Tribune has the larges print circulation in the state.  The table below lists these daily newspapers that are printed at least five days a week.  Many also have on-line and Facebook sites for interacting with readers and disseminating news.  The cities and counties listed are the locations of the newspaper's headquarters.  Circulation numbers are the 2019 data in the Minnesota Newspaper Association directory.

Online only newspapers
The following newspapers are published online and do not have print circulation:

Special interest newspapers

Non-daily print newspapers
The following newspapers are published in the state of Minnesota, as of 2019, with a print frequency of less than five days a week.

Defunct newspapers

 Gnistan, 1891–1892, Minneapolis, a Swedish-language radical, Socialist-Unitarian newspaper
 Western Appeal, then The Appeal, 1885–1923, St. Paul. Weekly, African-American readership

Gallery

College newspapers
 Augsburg University – The Echo
 Bemidji State University – Northern Student
 Bethel University – The Clarion
 Carleton College – The Carletonian
 College of Saint Benedict and Saint John's University – The Record
 Concordia College (Moorhead) – The Concordian
 Gustavus Adolphus College – The Gustavian Weekly
 Hamline University – The Oracle
 Luther Seminary – The Concord
 Macalester College – The Mac Weekly
 Minnesota State University, Mankato – The Reporter
 North Central University – The Northerner
 St. Catherine – The St. Catherine Wheel
 St. Cloud State University – University Chronicle
 St. Olaf College – The Manitou Messenger
 St. Thomas – The Aquin, TommieMedia
 University of Minnesota, Duluth – The Statesman
 University of Minnesota Morris – The University Register
 University of Minnesota, Twin Cities – Minnesota Daily, Minneapolis, Minnesota, Hennepin, founded 1900, Daily (Mon. thru Thurs. during academic year)
 Winona State University – The Winonan

See also
List of newspapers
List of newspapers in the United States
List of defunct newspapers of the United States
List of newspapers in the United States by circulation
List of media in Minnesota
List of radio stations in Minnesota
List of television stations in Minnesota

Notes

References

External lists
 Minnesota Newspaper Directory - directory of Minnesota newspapers

 List of Newspapers Published in Minnesota
Newspapers
Minnesota